The National Democrats (Nationaldemokraterna, ND) were a political party in Sweden, formed by a radical faction of the Sweden Democrats (SD) in October 2001 after they were expelled from the SD. The party described itself as a democratic nationalist and ethnopluralist party. The party disbanded on 23 April 2014.

In the 2002 general election the party received 9,248 votes, far below the 4 percent threshold necessary for parliamentary representation. In the 2006 general election the party received 3,064 votes (0.06%), however they had representation in two municipalities south of Stockholm. In the 2010 general election the party received 1,141 votes (0.02%). The chairman of the party was Marc Abramsson.

On 2 February 2008, the old party logo consisting of a blue and yellow sail was replaced with an orange cloudberry flower.

Ideology 
ND's ideology was described as xenophobic and/or racist. The party rejected these descriptions.

The party was critical of United States foreign policy and of NATO. The party also opposed what it called the "imperialist occupations of Serbia, Palestine, Iraq and Afghanistan."

Electoral results

Parliament (Riksdag)

Leadership

Party leader 
 Anders Steen (20012004)
 Tomas Johansson (20042005)
 Nils-Eric Hennix (20052006)
 Marc Abramsson (20062014)

See also
 Alternative for Sweden
 Party of the Swedes (2008-2015)

References

External links 

Euronat members
Far-right politics in Sweden
2001 establishments in Sweden
Political parties established in 2001
Political parties disestablished in 2014
2014 disestablishments in Sweden
Defunct political parties in Sweden
Swedish nationalism
Nationalist parties in Sweden
Third Position
Minor political parties in Sweden